Anja McCloskey (born c. 1982) is a German-American singer-songwriter signed to UK (United Kingdom) label Sotones Records. Her debut album An Estimation was released in September 2012 and received the Musicians Benevolent Fund ‘Emerging Excellence’ award. It was received positively by the press, with the Daily Express calling it "simply magnificent"  and Q Magazine making lead single A Kiss Track of the Day, referring to it as "sultry folk, like a Romany gypsy cabaret show" 

Anja was born to a German mother and an American father in the American Mid-West, but spent most of her childhood and teenage years in Elmshorn, Northern Germany. Choosing accordion as her first instrument after watching her grandfather play the instrument at family parties, she performed with the accordion orchestra Musikschule Elmshorn and was taught by Susanne Drdack. She moved to the United Kingdom at the age of twenty to obtain a degree in print journalism and remained in England, both in London and Southampton, until 2012. She currently resides in Des Moines, Iowa.

Anja has worked and performed with The Irrepressibles, Haunted Stereo, Helen McCookerybook, Ana Silvera, Katy Carr, Etao Shin, Moneytree, and David Miatt of Thomas Tantrum.

Her debut EP Turn, Turn, Turn was released on Sotones Records in September 2010, followed by a tour in the US. Anja's first full-length album An Estimation was released in September 2012. It spawned the singles And Her Head, A Kiss, Italian Song, and Instigate It.

Anja also plays piano and clarinet and is a contributor to music magazine Wears The Trousers. She is an active member of Sotones Records and a committed vegan.

External links
Anja McCloskey • Official Website
Anja McCloskey • Discogs

References 

1982 births
Living people
German women singer-songwriters
American women singer-songwriters
21st-century American women singers
21st-century American singers
21st-century German women singers